Bababaghi Hospice ( – Asāīyeshgāh-e Bābābāghī) is a village in Esperan Rural District, in the Central District of Tabriz County, East Azerbaijan Province, Iran. At the 2006 census, its population was 409, in 150 families. A hospital was established here, mainly through the efforts of Dr Mobayyen, for individuals affected with Leprosy.

References 

Populated places in Tabriz County
East Azerbaijan Province